Gerald Dockery (born August 17, 1970) is a former American football wide receiver who played four seasons in the Arena Football League with the Texas Terror, Grand Rapids Rampage and Houston ThunderBears. He attended Worthing High School in Houston, Texas. He first enrolled at Arizona Western College before transferring to Eastern New Mexico University. Dockery was also a member of the Calgary Stampeders.
Dockery was inducted into Evan E. Worthings 2022 Wall of Fame class as a QB '85-'89.

He served as head coach of the Katy Ruff Riders from 2007 to 2010 and was head coach of the Houston Stallions from 2011 to 2012. He was the offensive coordinator of the Corpus Christi Fury in 2016. In 2018, he joined the Georgia Doom as the team's offensive coordinator and assistant head coach. After head coach Derek Stingley left the team in May 2018, Dockery became the team's new head coach and defeated the league-leading Richmond Roughriders in his first game. The Doom went on to defeat both the top teams in the American Arena League before the Doom were suddenly withdrawn from playoff participation despite being the third seed. Dockery left the Doom after the season.

References

External links
 Just Sports Stats

Living people
1970 births
American football wide receivers
Canadian football wide receivers
African-American players of American football
African-American players of Canadian football
African-American coaches of American football
Arizona Western Matadors football players
Eastern New Mexico Greyhounds football players
Calgary Stampeders players
Texas Terror players
Grand Rapids Rampage players
Houston ThunderBears players
Indoor Football League coaches
Players of American football from Houston
Players of Canadian football from Houston
Indoor American football coaches
21st-century African-American sportspeople
20th-century African-American sportspeople